Marian Bełc  (27 January 191427 August 1942) was a Polish fighter ace of the Polish Air Force in World War II with 7 confirmed kills and one shared.

Biography
Marian Bełc graduated from pilot training at Lublinek air base near Łódź. On 2 November 1934 he was assigned to the 143rd Fighter Escadrille in Toruń. In autumn 1937 he was transferred to the Polish 152nd Fighter Escadrille in Wilno. During the Invasion of Poland Bełc shot down his first plane, on 3 September a Bf 109. After the Soviet invasion of Poland he was evacuated to France via Romania. He served in the Krasnodębski section of the Groupe de Chasse et de Défense I/55 under the command of Zdzisław Krasnodębski. In the same unit served two other Polish aces: Jan Zumbach and Stanisław Karubin. After the capitulation of France he came to the UK.  All pilots of the Krasnodębski section were posted 2 August 1940 to the No. 303 Polish Fighter Squadron. In the Battle of Britain Bełc downed 6 German planes.

On 15 April 1941 married Audrey Stephenson, their son Marian Edward was born on 27 October 1941.

In 1942 Bełc became an instructor in 58 OTU. On 27 August 1942, in a training flight with a British pilot their plane crash-landed. Both pilots were killed.

Aerial victory credits
 Bf 109 - 3 September 1939
 1/8 Do 215 - 18 September 1940
 Bf 109 - 26 September 1940
 Bf 110 - 5 October 1940
 Bf 109 - 7 October 1940
 Bf 109 - 24 June 1941
 Bf 109 - 28 June 1941
 Bf 109 - 24 July 1941

Awards
 Virtuti Militari, Silver Cross 
 Cross of Valour (Poland), three times
 Distinguished Flying Cross (United Kingdom)

References

Further reading
 
 
 
 
 
 
 Tadeusz Jerzy Krzystek, Anna Krzystek: Polskie Siły Powietrzne w Wielkiej Brytanii w latach 1940-1947 łącznie z Pomocniczą Lotniczą Służbą Kobiet (PLSK-WAAF). Sandomierz: Stratus, 2012, p. 88. 
 Józef Zieliński: Asy polskiego lotnictwa. Warszawa: Agencja lotnicza ALTAIR, 1994, p. 47. ISBN 83862172. 
 Józef Zieliński: Lotnicy polscy w Bitwie o Wielką Brytanię. Warszawa: Oficyna Wydawnicza MH, 2005, pp. 16–17. 

Marian Bełc.png

The Few
Recipients of the Distinguished Flying Cross (United Kingdom)
Polish World War II flying aces
Recipients of the Silver Cross of the Virtuti Militari
Recipients of the Cross of Valour (Poland)
1942 deaths
1914 births
Polish Royal Air Force pilots of World War II
Polish military personnel killed in World War II
Royal Air Force personnel killed in World War II